Owing to its origin in ancient Greece and Rome, English rhetorical theory frequently employs Greek and Latin words as terms of art. This page explains commonly used rhetorical terms in alphabetical order. The brief definitions here are intended to serve as a quick reference rather than an in-depth discussion. For more information, click the terms.

A
Absurdity. The exaggeration of a point beyond belief.
Accumulatio. The emphasis or summary of previously made points or inferences by excessive praise or accusation.
Acutezza. Wit or wordplay used in rhetoric.
Ad hominem. Rebutting an argument by attacking the character, motive, or other attribute of the person making it rather than the substance of the argument itself.
Adianoeta. A phrase carrying two meanings: an obvious meaning and a second, more subtle and ingenious one.
Adjunction. When a verb is placed at the beginning or the end of a sentence instead of in the middle. For example (from Rhetorica ad Herennium), "At the beginning, as follows: 'Fades physical beauty with disease or age.' At the end, as follows: 'Either with disease or age physical beauty fades.'"
Aesthetics. The examination of symbolic expression to determine its rhetorical possibilities.
Aetiologia. Giving a cause or a reason.
Affectus. A term used by the Italian Humanists of the Renaissance to describe the source of emotions or passions in the human mind.
Agenda. That which a persuader successfully makes salient and then spins. [see: Vatz, Richard E.]
Alliteration. The use of a series of two or more words beginning with the same letter.
Alloisis. The breaking down of a subject into its alternatives.
Ambigua. An ambiguous statement used in making puns.
Amphiboly or Amphibology. A sentence that may be interpreted in more than one way due to ambiguous structure.
Amplificatio. An all-purpose term for all the ways an argument can be expanded and enhanced.
Amplification. The act and the means of extending thoughts or statements to increase rhetorical effect, to add importance, or to make the most of a thought or circumstance.
Anacoenosis. A speaker asks his or her audience or opponents for their opinion or answer to the point in question.
Anacoluthon. An abrupt change of syntax within a sentence. (What I want is — like anybody cares.)
Anadiplosis. Repeating the last word of one clause or phrase to begin the next.
Analogy. The use of a similar or parallel case or example to reason or argue a point.
Anaphora. From the Greek , "I repeat". A succession of sentences beginning with the same word or group of words.
Anapodoton. The deliberate omission of a part of a clause, used to imply a specific meaning.
Anastrophe. Inversion of the natural word order.
Anecdote. A brief narrative describing an interesting or amusing event.
Animorum motus. The emotions.
Antanaclasis. From Greek ̩, a figure of speech involving a pun, consisting of the repeated use of the same word, each time with different meanings.
Antanagoge. Reply with a counter-indictment to an accusation.
Anthimeria. Substitution of one part of speech for another (such as a noun used as a verb). It is traditionally called antimeria.
Anticlimax. A bathetic collapse from an elevated subject to a mundane or vulgar one. A specialized form of catacosmesis.
Antimetabole. Repetition of two words or short phrases, but in reversed order to establish a contrast. It is a specialized form of chiasmus.
Antinome. Two ideas about the same topic that can be worked out to a logical conclusion, but the conclusions contradict each other.
Antiptosis. The substitution of one case for another.
Antistrophe. In rhetoric, repeating the last word in successive phrases. For example (from Rhetorica ad Herennium), "Since the time when from our state concord disappeared, liberty disappeared, good faith disappeared, friendship disappeared, the common weal disappeared." Also see: epiphora.
Antithesis. The juxtaposition of contrasting ideas in balanced or parallel words, phrases, or grammatical structures; the second stage of the dialectic process.
Antonomasia. The substitution of an epithet for a proper name.
Aphaeresis. The omission of a syllable from the beginning of a word.
Apocope. The omission of the last letter or syllable of a word.
Apo koinou construction. A blend of two clauses through a lexical word that has two syntactical functions, one in each of the blended clauses.
Apophasis / Apophesis. Pretending to deny something as a means of implicitly affirming it. As paralipsis, mentioning something by saying that you will not mention it. The opposite of occupatio.
Aporia. A declaration of doubt, made for rhetorical purpose and often feigned.
Aposiopesis. An abrupt stop in the middle of a sentence; used by a speaker to convey unwillingness or inability to complete a thought or statement.
Apostrophe. From Greek , a figure of speech consisting of a sudden turn in a text towards an exclamatory address to an imaginary person or a thing.
Appeals. Rhetorical devices used to enhance the plausibility of one's argument; Aristotle's appeals included ethos, logos, and pathos.
Apposition. The placement of two words or phrases side by side with one element serving to define or modify the other.
Arete. Virtue, excellence of character, qualities that would be inherent in a "natural leader", a component of ethos.
Argument. Discourse characterized by reasons advanced to support conclusions.
Argumentum ad baculum. Settling a question by appealing to force.
Argumentum ad hominem. Using what you know about your opponent's character as a basis for your argument.
Arrangement. See: dispositio.
Ars arengandi. Teaching of forensic speaking during the Medieval rhetorical era.
Ars dictaminis. The art of writing letters, introduced and taught during the Medieval rhetorical era.
Ars poetica. Medieval teaching of grammar and style through analysis of poetry.
Ars praedicandi. The art of preaching based on rhetorical ideas and introduced during the Medieval rhetorical era during an increasing intersection between rhetoric and religion.
Artistic proofs. Rhetorically produced methods for persuasion. For Aristotle, three possibilities would be ethos, pathos, and logos.
 Assonance. Words that repeat the same vowel sound.
Asyndeton. The deliberate omission of conjunctions that would normally be used.
Audience. Real, imagined, invoked, or ignored, this concept is at the very center of the intersections of composing and rhetoric.
Aureation. The use of Latinate and polysyllabic terms to "heighten" diction.
Auxesis. To place words or phrases in a certain order for climactic effect.
Axioms. The point where scientific reasoning starts. Principles that are not questioned.

B
Backing. Supporting an argument's merit.
Barbarism. Use of a non-standard word, expression or pronunciation in a language, particularly one prescriptively regarded as an error in morphology.
Bases. The issues at question in a judicial case.
Bathos. An emotional appeal that inadvertently evokes laughter or ridicule.
Bdelygmia. Expression of hatred or contempt.
Belles lettres. Written works considered quality because they are pleasing to the senses.
Belletristic movement. Movement of rhetoric in the late 18th and early 19th centuries emphasizing stylistic considerations of rhetoric. It also expanded rhetoric into a study of literature and literary criticism and writing.
Bomphiologia. Bombastic speech: a rhetorical technique wherein the speaker brags excessively.
Brachylogia. Brevity of diction.
Brevitas. Concise expression.
Burden of proof. Theory of argument giving the obligation of proving a case to the asserting party.
Buzzword. A word or phrase used to impress, or one that is fashionable.

C
Canon. A term often used to discuss significant literary works in a specific field, used by Cicero to outline five significant parts of the rhetorical composition process.
Captatio benevolentiae. Any literary or oral device that seeks to secure the goodwill of the recipient or hearer, as in a letter or in a discussion.
Catachresis. The inexact use of a similar word in place of the proper one to create an unlikely metaphor. For example (from Rhetorica ad Herennium), "The power of man is short" or "the long wisdom in the man".
Catacosmesis. A reverse climax: an arrangement of phrases or topics in decreasing order, as with best, worse, worst. Its extreme form is anticlimax.
Charisma. An attribute that allows a speaker's words to become powerful.
Chiasmus. From the name of the Greek letter "", a figure of speech consisting of the contrasting of two structurally parallel syntactic phrases arranged "cross-wise", i.e., in such a way that the second is in reverse order from the first.
Chreia. Chreia (from Greek χρεία = useful) is an anecdote (a deed, a saying, a situation) involving a well-known figure. 
Circumlocution.  Use of many words where a few would do.
Circa rem. Latin: The circumstances surrounding the act in one Roman topical system.
Claim 1. A primary point being made to support an argument. 2. Stephen Toulmin: the resulting conclusion to an argument.
Classicism. A revival in the interest of classical antiquity languages and texts.
Climax. An arrangement of phrases or topics in increasing order, as with good, better, best. The opposite of catacosmesis.
Colon. A colon (Greek κῶλον) is a rhetorical figure consisting of a clause that is grammatically, but not logically, complete.
Colloquialism. A word or phrase that is not formal or literary, typically one used in ordinary or familiar conversation.
Common topics. Arguments and approaches useful in rhetorical settings; koinoi topoi.
Comparatio. Arguments by comparison.
Consubstantiality. Substance commonality.
Conclusio. Latin: A letter's conclusion.
Conduplicatio. Latin: A doubling. The repetition of words, generally in adjacent phrases.
Confirmatio. Latin: The section of a judicial speech (in Roman rhetorical theory) that offers evidence supporting the claims given during the statement of facts.
Confutatio. Latin: Counterargument in Roman rhetorical theory.
Constraints. Referring to "persons, events, objects, and relations that are parts of the situation because they have the power to constrain decision and action needed to modify the exigence". Originally used by Lloyd Bitzer.
Contingency. In rhetoric, it relates to the contextual circumstances that do not allow an issue to be settled with complete certainty.
Context. The circumstances surrounding an issue that should be considered during its discussion.
Conversio. Repetition of a word at the end of a sentence.
Conversation model. The model, in critique of traditional rhetoric by Sally Gearhart, that maintains the goal of rhetoric is to persuade others to accept your own personal view as correct.
Cookery. Plato believed rhetoric was to truth as cookery was to medicine. Cookery disguises itself as medicine and appears to be more pleasing, when in actuality it has no real benefit.
Critical theory. Systematically analyzing any means of communication for hidden assumptions and connotations.
Concession. Acknowledgment of objections to a proposal.

D
Data. Stephen Toulmin. Initial evidence supporting a claim.
Deconstruction. Analyzing communication artifacts by scrutinizing their meaning and related assumptions, with the goal of determining the social and systemic connotations behind their structure.
Deduction. Moving from an overall hypothesis to infer something specific about that hypothesis.
Delectare. To delight; viewed by Cicero as one of the three goals of rhetoric.
Delivery. Canon #5 in Cicero's list of rhetorical canons; traditionally linked to oral rhetoric, refers to how a speech is given (including tone of voice and nonverbal gestures, among others).
Demos. The ruling body of free citizens in ancient Athens and other city states, considered as a political entity; population; the common people.  A root of the word democracy.
Descriptio (energia, diatyposis): Clear, lucid, and vivid description (especially of the potential consequences of some action)
Dialectic. A rhetorical term that has been defined differently by Aristotle and Ramus, among others; generally, it means using verbal communication to come to an agreement on a topic.
Diallage. Establishing a single point with the use of several arguments.
Dictamen. The art of writing letters.
Diminutio (related to meiosis, litotes): a form of understatement, and implication of more than the words say
Dispositio. In the classical theory of the production of speech, pronuntiatio dispositio refers to the stage of planning the structure and sequence of ideas. Often referred to as arrangement, the second of Cicero's five rhetorical canons.
Dissoi logoi. Contradictory arguments.
Distribution. Dividing a whole subject into its various parts.
Divisio. (prosapodosis): Distinguishing the alternatives of a question, and resolving each, by subjoining a reason
Docere. To teach; viewed by Cicero as one of the three goals of rhetoric.
Dramatistic. Way to look at the nature of language stressing on language as an action. ex. uses expressions such as 'thou shalt' and 'thou shalt not'.
Dubitatio. Expression of uncertainty as to which of two phrases is most suitable.
Dysphemism. A term with negative associations for something in reality fairly innocuous or inoffensive.

E
Ecphonesis. A sentence consisting of a single word or short phrase ending with an exclamation point.
Ellipse. The suppression of ancillary words to render an expression more lively or more forceful.
Elocutio. In the classical theory of the production of a speech (Pronuntiatio), elocution refers to the stage of elaborating the wording of a text, using correct grammar and diction.
Enallage. The switching of grammatical forms for an expressive purpose.
Energia. The Greek word for 'energy' that was used by Aristotle in reference to the force or vigor of expression in writing or speech.
Enthymeme. A type of argument that is grounded in assumed commonalities between a rhetor and the audience. (For example: Claim 1: Bob is a person. Therefore, Claim 3: Bob is mortal. The assumption (unstated Claim 2) is that People are mortal). In Aristotelian rhetoric, an enthymeme is known as a "rhetorical syllogism:" it mirrors the form of a syllogism, but it is based on opinion rather than fact (For example: Claim 1: These clothes are tacky. Claim 2: I am wearing these clothes. Claim 3: Therefore, I am unfashionable).
Enumeratio. Making a point more forcibly by listing detailed causes or effects; to enumerate: count off or list one by one.
Epanalepsis. A figure of speech in which the same word or phrase appears both at the beginning and at the end of a clause.
Epanaphora. In rhetoric, repeating the same word or phrase at the beginning of successive phrases for emphasis. For example (from Rhetorica ad Herennium), "To you must go the credit for this, to you are thanks due, to you will this act of yours bring glory."
Epideictic. Ceremonial rhetoric, such as might be found in a funeral or victory speech.
Epiphora. The repetition of a phrase or word at the end of several sentences or clauses. Also see: anaphora.
Epistemology. Philosophical study directed at understanding how people gain knowledge.
Epistrophe. A succession of clauses, phrases or sentences that all end with the same word or group of words.
Epithet. A term used as a descriptive and qualifying substitute for the name of a person, place or thing.

Epizeuxis. Emphasizing an idea using one word repetition.
Eristic. Communicating with the aim of winning the argument regardless of truth. The idea is not necessarily to lie, but to present the communication so cleverly that the audience is persuaded by the power of the presentation.
Erotema. The so-called 'Rhetorical Question', where a question is asked to which an answer is not expected.
Ethos. A rhetorical appeal to an audience based on the speaker/writer's credibility.
Ethopoeia. The act of putting oneself into the character of another to convey that persons feelings and thoughts more vividly.
Euphemism. An innocuous, inoffensive or circumlocutory term or phrase for something unpleasant or obscene. E.g., in advertising for female hygiene products any liquid shown is never red, it's usually blue.
Evidence. In rhetoric, facts or testimony used to strengthen a claim.
Exclamatio. (apostrophe): an expression of grief or indignation, addressed to a person, place, or object.
Exemplum. The citation of an example, either truthful or fictitious.
Exigence. A rhetorical call to action; a situation that compels someone to speak out.
Exordium. The introductory (Lat: exordium, beginning) portion of an oration.
Expression. applying the correct language to an argument.

F
Fable. A short allegorical story.
Facetiae. Latin, humor or wit.
Facilitas. The improvising of effective oral or written language to suit any situation.
Faculty psychology. 18th century, the mind contains faculties that include understanding, imagination, passion, and will.
False consciousness. (Marxism), a distorted view of reality, people, and the world.
Feminist rhetoric. Rhetorical theory concerned with feminism and its critique of social structures.
Fictio. The attribution of rational traits to non-rational creatures.
Field-dependent. Stephen Toulmin's term, standards for assessing arguments that are specific to a certain field.
Field-invariant. Stephen Toulmin's term, standards for assessing arguments that are not determined by the particular field.
Figure. Unusual arrangement of language that tries to achieve unique meaning for ideas.
Figura etymologica. Repetition of two etymologically related terms.
Forensic oratory. speaking in a courtroom.

G
Gens. Latin, an influential group of families.
Genera. (Plural of genus) Classification by race, kind, or possession of similarities; descriptive of different types of oratory.
Graecismus. The use of Greek idiom.

H
Hendiadys. Using two nouns linked by a conjunction to express a single complex idea.
Hermeneutics. The theoretical underpinnings of interpreting texts, usually religious or literary.
Heteroglossia. Refers to use of a variety of voices or styles within one literary work or context.
Heuristics. Determining or applying the proper methods for investigation.
Homologia. A tedious style or redundancy of style.
Homoioteleuton. From the ancient Greek όμοιοτέλευτος/homoioteleutos (ὅμοιος/hόmoios = "same", and τελευτή/teleutế = "ending") is a figure of speech where adjacent or parallel words have similar endings inside a verse, a sentence. Authors often use it to evoke music or to give a rhythm to their phrase. 
Horismus. A brief and often antithetical definition.
Humblebrag. A statement that purports to be modest while delivering a boast.
Hypallage. A literary device that reverses the syntactic relation of two words (as in "her beauty's face").
Hyperbaton. A figure of speech in which words that naturally belong together are separated from each other for emphasis or effect.
Hyperbole. A figure of speech where emphasis is achieved through exaggeration, independently or through comparison. For example (from Rhetorica ad Herennium), "His body was as white as snow, his face burned like fire."
Hypophora. When a speaker asks aloud what his/her adversaries have to say for themselves or against the speaker, and then proceeds to answer the question. For example (from Rhetorica ad Herennium), "When he reminded you of your old friendship, were you moved? No, you killed him nevertheless, and with even greater eagerness. And then when his children grovelled at your feet, were you moved to pity? No, in your extreme cruelty you even prevented their father's burial."
Hypothesis. An educated guess; usually a clause claiming "if" something happens, "then" a result will come of it.
Hypsos. Great or worthy writing, sometimes called sublime. Longinus's theme in On the Sublime.
Hypozeuxis. A sentence in which every clause has its own subject and verb.
Hysteron proteron. A rhetorical device in which the first key word of the idea refers to something that happens temporally later than the second key word. The goal is to call attention to the more important idea by placing it first.

I
Icon. Using imagery to create resemblance.
Identification. Connecting with a larger group through a shared interpretation or understanding of a larger concept; Kenneth Burke was one of the first people to use the term in this way.
Ideology. A way of understanding one's external surroundings.
Ignoratio elenchi. A conclusion that is irrelevant.
Imitatio. Latin, imitation.
Inartistic proofs. Discovered information stemming from the raw data of experience.
Inclusio. A literary device based on an envelope structure.
Indefinite questions. In Quintlian, questions that are discussed without referring to anything specifically.
Indignatio. To arouse indignation in the audience.
Induction. Rhetorical method for coming to general conclusions through specific examples.
Ingenium. Latin, In Vico- the ability to understand similarities and relationships that is innate in all humans.
In re. Latin, arguments concerned with what actually happened.
Institutio Oratoria. Educational and rhetorical principles as described and prescribed in treatise by Quintillian.
Insultatio. Abusing a person to his/her face by using irony and derisive language.
Interlacement. Combining the figures Antistrophe and Epanaphora for rhetorical style and emphasis. For example (from Rhetorica ad Herennium), "Who are they who have often broken treaties? The Carthaginians. Who are they who have waged war with severest cruelty? The Carthaginians."
Intersubjective agreements. agreements on the fair conduct of an argument among individuals participating in dialogue.
Invention. Described by Cicero as the process of determining "valid or seemingly valid arguments;" the first of his five rhetorical canons.
Invitational rhetoric. (Foss and Griffin, 1995) rhetoric involving "an invitation to understanding as a means to create a relationship rooted in quality, immanent value, and self-determination". Emphasizes the relationship between the speaker and freedoms of the audience to make decisions for themselves in order to promote equality.
Ioci. Jokes, see: Cicero's De Oratore and his theory of humor.
Irony. A deliberate contrast between indirect and direct meaning to draw attention to the opposite.
Isocolon. A string of phrases of corresponding structure and equal length.
Issues of definition. Things related to naming an act.
Issues of fact. Issues related to an act's occurrence.
Issues of quality. Issues related to the seriousness of an act.

J
Jargon. Highly technical language used by specific group.
Judicial. Type of oratory used to attack or defend someone in a court of law.

K
Kairos. Generally means, "timing" or "the right circumstances".
Kategoria. Greek for Accusation.
Koinoi topoi. Common topics; in a rhetoric situation, useful arguments and strategies.
Koinonia. To consult with your opponent or judge.
Kolakeia. Flattery; telling people what they want to hear while disregarding their best interests; employed by sophistic rhetoricians.

L
Latinitas. Stylistic feature involving the proper use of language.
Lexis. Style.
Literae humanae. Academic disciplines that are known as the liberal arts: languages, philosophy, history, literature, music, art and certain abstract sciences.
Litotes. Stating a positive by negating the negative — a form of understatement. ("I am not unaware of your difficulties.")
Localism. A word, phrase, or custom particular to one's location.
Loci communes. Types of arguments. Quintillian trained orators to learn intellectual habits to access the arguments quickly.
Locution. Refers to the utterance of a statement.
Logical fallacy. Misconceptions resulting from faulty reasoning.
Logical positivism. The effort to make scientific standards applicable for resolving all issues.
Logical proof. Arguments used to persuade audience. Reasoned.
Logos. Rhetorical appeals based on logic or reasoning.
Logology. Kenneth Burke. Study of the specific theological terms used. Not to find the truth or falseness of the statement, but why that particular word was chosen.

M
Major premise. Statement in a syllogism. Generalization.
Magnanimity. Doing good to others, "its opposite is meanness of spirit" (from Aristotle's Rhetoric).
Material fallacy. False notion concerning the subject matter of an argument.
Maxim. "A saying drawn from life, which shows concisely either what happens or ought to happen in life, for example: 'Every beginning is difficult.'" (from Rhetorica ad Herennium)
Memory. Described by Cicero as the "firm mental grasp of matter and words;" the fourth of his five rhetorical canons.
Mesodiplosis. The repetition of a word or group of words in the middle of successive clauses.
Metanarrative. Universal theories positing to know all aspects of humanity.
Metaphor. A figure of speech where a word that normally applies to one thing is used to designate another for the sake of creating a mental picture. For example (from Rhetorica ad Herennium), "... he lightly breathed a favoring breath".
Metonymy. A figure of speech that substitutes one word or phrase for another with which it is closely associated. For example (from Rhetorica ad Herennium), "one should say 'wine' for 'Liber', 'wheat' for 'Ceres'." In UK, people speak of "Crown property" meaning property belonging to the State. Similarly: "The White House had no comment to make." ("White House", the residence and office building of the president of the United States, is used as a metonymy for the president or the president's administration. 
Metron. Greek, measure.
Minor premise. Statement in an argument.
Modus inveniendi. Latin, in St Augustine, material used to understand the scriptures.
Modus proferendi. Latin, in St. Augustine, expressing ideas found within the scriptures.
Moral reasoning. Reasoning employed in rhetoric that determines a conclusion based on evidence. Used in issues of ethics, religion, economics, and politics.
Motive. Something that plays a role in one's decision to act.
Movere. To persuade; viewed by Cicero as one of the three goals of rhetoric.

N
Narratio. A presentation of essential facts in a judicial speech.
Narration. Story telling, involving the elements of time, place, actor, action, cause and manner.
Necessary cause. Cause without which effect couldn't/wouldn't have occurred.
Negatio. To negate or deny.
Neoplatonism. School of thought emanating from the works of Plato and Aristotle in early BCE Rome.
Noema. Speech that is deliberately subtle or obscure.
Nomos. Greek, a social custom or convention.
Non sequitur. A statement bearing no relationship to the preceding context.
Notaries. Secretaries trained in rhetoric for dealing with the agreements that were needed for commercial cities in Italy to function.

O
Occupatio. Introducing and responding to one's opponents' arguments before they have the opportunity to bring them up. The opposite of apophasis.
Oictos. A show of pity or compassion.
Ominatio. A prophecy of evil.
Onomatopoeia. Words that imitate the sounds, objects, or actions they refer to. (ex. "buzz", "hullabaloo", "bling")
Opening. First part of discourse. Should gain audiences' attention.
Optatio. A wish exclaimed.
Orcos. An oath.
Oxymoron. Opposed or markedly contradictory terms joined for emphasis.

P 

Parachesis. Repetition of the same sound in several words in close succession. Alliteration (initial rhyme) is a special case of parachesis.
. Greek, argument created by a list of examples that leads to a probable generalized idea.
Paradiastole. Greek, redescription - usually in a better light.
Paradox. An apparently absurd or self-contradictory statement or proposition.
Paralipsis. A form of apophasis when a rhetor introduces a subject by denying it should be discussed. To speak of someone or something by claiming not to.
Parallelism. The correspondence, in sense or construction, of successive clauses or passages.
Parallel syntax. Repetition of similar sentence structures.
Parallel structure. Using the same tense and structure.
Paraprosdokian. A sentence in which the latter half takes an unexpected turn.
Parataxis. Using juxtaposition of short, simple sentences to connect ideas, as opposed to explicit conjunction.
Parenthesis. An explanatory or qualifying word, clause, or sentence inserted into a passage that is not essential to the literal meaning.
Paremvolia. An interference of speak by speaking.
Parisosis. When clauses have very similar lengths, as measured by syllables; sometimes taken as equivalent to isocolon.
Parody. To imitate something or somebody comically.
Paromoiosis. Parallelism of sound between the words of two clauses approximately equal in size. The similarity of sound can occur at the beginning of the clauses, at the end (where it is equivalent to homoioteleuton), in the middle or throughout the clauses.
Paronomasia. A pun, a play on words, often for humorous effect.
Particular audience. In Perelman and Olbrechts-Tyteca, the actual audience the orator addresses.
Pathos. Greek, the emotional appeal to an audience in an argument. One of Aristotle's three proofs.
Perfectus orator. Latin, a complete orator.
Periphrasis. The substitution of many or several words where one would suffice; usually to avoid using that particular word.
Peroratio. Latin, the last section of a judicial speech where the speaker is the strongest.
Personification. A figure of speech that gives human characteristics to inanimate objects, or represents an absent person as being present. For example (from Rhetorica ad Herennium), "But if this invincible city should now give utterance to her voice, would she not speak as follows?"
Petitio. Latin, in a letter, an announcement, demand, or request.
Phallogocentrism. Examines the relationship between logos (reason) and the phallus (representative of male genitalia). Just as the phallus is implicitly and sometimes explicitly assumed to be the only significant sexual organ, the masculine is the accepted as the central point of reference of validity and authority for a society.
Phronesis. Greek, practical wisdom; common sense.
Physis. Greek, nature.
Pian. Ancient China, the art of disputing.
Pistis. Greek, belief.
Plausibility. Rhetoric that is believable right away due to its association with something that the audience already knows or has experienced.
Pleonasm. The use of more words than necessary to express an idea.
Poetriae, Ars. Latin, poetry as an art.
Polis. Greek, the city-state, especially the people in the city-state.
Polyphonic. Having multiple voices.
Polyptoton. The repetition of a word or root in different cases or inflections within the same sentence.
Polysemy. The capacity of a word or phrase to render more than one meaning. 
Polysyndeton. The repeated use of conjunctions within a sentence, particularly where they do not necessarily have to be used.
Portrayal. Describing a person clearly enough for recognition. For example (from Rhetorica ad Herennium), "I mean him, men of the jury, the ruddy, short, bent man, with white and rather curly hair, blue-grey eyes, and a huge scar on his chin, if perhaps you can recall him to memory."
Position. The stance taken by a rhetor that s/he is attempting to prove through argumentation.
Positivism. Term created by Auguste Comte that posits that science, math, or logic can prove any reasonable claim.
Postmodernism. Related to rhetoric, a field of inquiry concerned with the ideological underpinnings of commonly held assumptions.
Praedicandi, Ars. Latin, Preaching.
Praecisio. The act of breaking off abruptly, aposiopesis.
Praegnans constructio. A form of brachylogy in which two clauses or two expressions are condensed into one.
Pragmatism. Approach based on practical consideration and immediate perception to the exclusion of moral (in the sense of 'should') and ethic arguments.
Pragmatographia. Description of an action (such as a battle, a feast, a marriage, a burial, etc.).
Praise sandwich. Delivering criticism together with praise.
Presence. In Perelman and Olbrechts-Tyteca, choosing to emphasize certain facts and ideas instead of others, leading the audience along that path.
Presumption. An idea is reasonable or acceptable only until it is sufficiently challenged.
Preterition. Mentioning something by professing to omit it.
Priamel. A series of compared alternatives which serve as foils to the true subject of a poem.
Progymnasmata. A series of preliminary rhetorical exercises that began in ancient Greece and continued during the Roman Empire.
Prolepsis. In argumentation, the speaker answers the opponent's possible objections before they can be made. It is also a literary device in which a future state is spoken of in the present; for example, a condemned man may be called a "dead man walking". Also called procatalepsis.
Proof surrogate. An expression used to suggest that there is evidence or authority for a claim without actually citing such evidence or authority.
Prosopopoeia. Speaking as another person or object; in a sense, the inverse of apostrophe.
Pronuntiato. Latin: The delivery of an oration or an argument in a manner befitting the subject matter and style, while maintaining control of voice and body.
Protreptic. Greek, the potential to persuade through language.
Prudence. Judging practically.
Psogos. Greek for blame.
Psychagogos. Greek for a poet.
Psyche. Greek for the mind or soul.
Public sphere. Place where individuals can engage in discussion without the political or state interests interfering.
Purpose. What the speaker or writer is trying to do with language.

Q
Quadrivium. The major subjects taught in medieval times: geometry, arithmetic, astronomy, and music.
Quaestiones. Debatable points around which disputes are centered.

R
Reasoning by contraries. Where the first statement of two opposite statements directly proves the second. For example (from Rhetorica ad Herennium), "Or how should you expect a person whose arrogance has been insufferable in private life, to be agreeable and not forget himself when in power...?"
Repetition, repetition, repetition is the simple repeating of a word for emphasis.
Rebuttal. Stephen Toulmin's term, conditions on the acceptability of a claim.
Res. Latin: An argument's substance.
Rhetor. A person who is in the course of presenting or preparing rhetorical discourse.
Rhetores. (Greek) Those who make a living by speaking persuasively.
Rhetoric. The study and practice of good effective expression. Also a type of discourse- focusing on goals of the speech or piece of writing that attempts to sway the mind of the audience.
Rhetoric of fiction. Wayne Booth's idea "the author's judgement is always present" in a narrative.
Rhetorical audience. Those who can be persuaded by rhetoric.
Rhetorical discourse. Discourse created within the boundary of the principles of rhetoric.
Rhetorical opposition. Protagoras's idea that there are two sides to everything.
Rhetorical question. A question asked to make a point instead of to elicit a direct answer.
Rhetorical situation. A term made popular by Lloyd Bitzer; describes the scenario that contains a speech act, including the considerations (purpose, audience, author/speaker, constraints to name a few) that play a role in how the act is produced and perceived by its audience. The counterargument regarding Bitzer's situation-rhetoric relationship was made by Richard E. Vatz in "The Myth of the Rhetorical Situation" and "The Mythical Status of Situational Rhetoric" in The Review of Communication, 2009. He argued for a salience-meaning (or now, agenda-framing-spin) model of persuasion, which emphasized rhetoric as a creative act with increased agent or persuader responsibility for the situation his or her rhetoric creates. He maintained this added to the importance of rhetorical study and that Bitzer's formulation was "anti-rhetorical".
Rhetorical theory. The organized presentation of the art or rhetoric, descriptions of the various functions of rhetoric, and clarifications of how rhetoric achieves its goals.

S
Salience/Agenda; Meaning/Spin. The basic components of all rhetorical struggles, per Richard E Vatz, The Only Authentic Book of Persuasion, (Kendall Hunt, 2013).
Salon. Intellectual assembly in an aristocratic setting; primarily associated with France in the 17th and 18th centuries.
Salutatio. (Latin) A written greeting.
Sannio. (Latin) the fool. The role to avoid when using humor in a speech.
Scesis onomaton. (Greek) omit the verb. A style of repeating an idea using words or phrases similar in meaning in close proximity.
Scare-line. A word or phrase that is quoted to scare the reader, or, in a political campaign, to smear an opposing candidate, or to cause an estrangement or cause something to seem unfamiliar in a supernatural way
Scholasticism. Rhetorical study of Christianity that was intellectually prominent in 11th–15th-century Western Europe, emphasizing rhetorical concepts by Aristotle and a search for universal truth.
Scientific method. A system of observing and analyzing data through induction; prominent school of thought since the 17th century whose proponents are often critical of rhetoric.
Scientific reasoning. Moving from axioms to actual conclusions. Also Syllogistic logic.
Scientism. In Weaver, applying scientific assumptions to subjects that are not completely natural.
Scientistic. Kenneth Burke. Way of looking at the nature of language as a way of naming or defining something. ex. 'It is' or 'It is not.'
Second Sophistic. Rhetorical era in Rome that dealt primarily with rhetorical style through some of the Greek Sophists' concepts, while neglecting its political and social uses because of censorship.
Semantics. Philosophical study of language that deals with its connection to perceptions of reality.
Semiotics. Branch of semantics concerning language and communication as a system of symbols.
Sensus communis. A society's basic beliefs and values.
Sententia. Applying a general truth to a situation by quoting a maxim or other wise saying as a conclusion or summary of that situation.
Shui. Formal persuasion in ancient China.
Sign. Term from semiotics that describes something that has meaning through its connection to something else, like words.
Signifying. Term from semiotics that describes the method through which meaning is created with arbitrary signs.
Simile. A figure of speech that compares unlike things, implying a resemblance between them. For example (from Rhetorica ad Herennium), "He entered the combat in body like the strongest bull, in impetuosity like the fiercest lion."
Skepticism. Type of thought that questions whether universal truth exists and is attainable by humans.
Solecismus. Ignorantly misusing tenses, cases, and genders.
Sophists. Considered the first professional teachers of oratory and rhetoric (ancient Greece 4th century BC).
Soraismus. The ignorant or affected mingling of languages.
Spin. In Vatz, the act of competing to infuse meaning into agenda items for chosen audiences.
Spoonerism. The deliberate or involuntary switching of sounds or morphemes between two words of a phrase, rendering a new meaning. 
Sprezzatura. The ability to appear that there is seemingly little effort used to attain success. The art of being able to show that one is able to deceive. Baldessare Castiglione.
Starting points. In Perelman and Olbrechts-Tyteca, the place between the speaker and audience where the argument can begin.
Stasis system. System of finding arguments by means of looking at ideas that are contradictory.
Status quo. Latin: The generally accepted existing condition or state of affairs.
Straw man. An argument that is a logical fallacy based on misrepresentation of an opponent's position.
Structural ambiguity. A sentence that may be interpreted in more than one way due to ambiguous structure.
Studia humanitatis. Latin: Humanistic studies deemed indispensable in Renaissance-era education; rhetoric, poetics, ethics, politics.
Syllepsis. A word modifying others in appropriate, though often incongruous ways. This is a similar concept to zeugma.
Syllogism. A type of valid argument that states if the first two claims are true, then the conclusion is true. (For example: Claim 1: People are mortal. Claim 2: Bob is a person. Therefore, Claim 3: Bob is mortal.) Started by Aristotle.
Syllogistic logic. Reasoning in the form of a syllogism.
Symbol. A visual or metaphorical representation of an idea or concept.
Symbolic inducement. Term coined by Kenneth Burke to refer to rhetoric.
Sympheron. (Greek) Path that is to one's advantage.
Symploce. A figure of speech in which several successive clauses have the same first and last words.
Synchysis. Word order confusion within a sentence.
Syncope. The omission of letters from the middle of a word, usually replaced by an apostrophe.
Synecdoche. A rhetorical device where one part of an object is used to represent the whole. E.g., "There are fifty head of cattle." (Head is substituting for the whole animal). "Show a leg!" (naval command to get out of bed = show yourself)
Syntactic ambiguity. A sentence that may be interpreted in more than one way due to ambiguous structure.

T
Tapinosis. Language or an epithet that is debasing. This term is synonymous with Meiosis (figure of speech).
Taste. A learned admiration for things of beauty.
Tautologia. The same idea repeated in different words.
Taxis. The distribution of a proper adjunct to every subject.
Techne. Greek for a true art.
Terministic screens. term coined by Kenneth Burke to explain the way in which the world is viewed when taking languages and words into consideration.
Theme. The central topic of discussion.
Thesis. The major claim or premise made in an argument to be proved or dis-proved.
Thesmos. Greek. The law that comes from the authority of kings.
Tmesis. Separating the parts of a compound word by a different word (or words) to create emphasis or other similar effects.
Tone. The author's voice in an essay through use of figurative language or a style of enunciation in writing (also known as a diction). The way the author expresses himself out loud or through a character.
Topical systems. Methods for finding arguments.
Topographia. The description of a place.
Topothesia. The description of an imaginary or non-existent place.
Topos. A line or specific style of argument.
Toulmin Model. A method of diagramming arguments created by Stephen Toulmin that identifies such components as backing, claim, data, qualifier, rebuttal, and warrant.
Translative issue. Dealing with procedure of an ensuing case.
Tricolon. The pattern of three phrases in parallel, found commonly in Western writing after Cicero. For example, the kitten had white fur, blue eyes, and a pink tongue.
Trivium. (Latin) Grammar, rhetoric, and logic taught in schools during the medieval period.
Tropes. Figure of speech that uses a word aside from its literal meaning.

U
Understatement. A form of irony, also called litotes, in which something is represented as less than it really is, with the intent of drawing attention to and emphasizing the opposite meaning.
Universal audience. An audience consisting of all humankind (most specifically of adult age and normal mental capacity).
Utterance. Statement that could contain meaning about one's own person.

V
Validity. Apprehension over the structure of an argument.
Validity claim. Claiming to have made a correct statement.
Verba. The part of an argument that advances the subject matter.
Verbum volitans. A word that floats in the air, on which everyone is thinking and is just about to be imposed.
Visual rhetoric. A theoretical framework describing how visual images communicate, as opposed to aural or verbal messages.
Vir bonus dicendi peritus. Latin: The good man skilled at speaking well.
Vita activa. A life lived in active involvement in the political arena.

W
Warrant. term used by Stephen Toulmin to establish a link between data and a claim.
Ways and means. One of the five main matters that Aristotle claims political speakers make speeches on. It consists of the speaker's country's revenue and sources, as well as the expenditures of the country.

Z
Zeugma. From the Greek word ζεύγμα, meaning 'yoke'. A figure of speech in which one word applies to two others in different senses of that word, and in some cases only logically applies to one of the other two words. This is a similar concept to syllepsis.

References

External links

Rhetorical terms
Rhetoric
Rhetorical techniques
Wikipedia glossaries using unordered lists